Sevilla is a station on Line 2 of the Madrid Metro. It is located in fare Zone A. The station was opened on 15 June 1924 as part of Line 2.

On 11 May 2019, the station was reopened after more than a year of extensive renovation works, during which three elevators were installed, making it fully accessible for people with physical disabilities. Additional improvements included an improved fire protection system and new toll gates.

References 

Line 2 (Madrid Metro) stations
Railway stations in Spain opened in 1924